Young Fathers are a Scottish group formed in Edinburgh, Scotland in 2008. Their second EP, Tape Two (2013), won the Scottish Album of the Year Award. In 2014, they won the Mercury Prize for their debut album Dead. A second album, White Men Are Black Men Too, followed in 2015. Their third album, Cocoa Sugar (2018), peaked at number 28 on the UK Albums Chart earned the band their second Scottish Album of the Year Award. Their fourth album, Heavy Heavy, was released in 2023.

History
Formed in Edinburgh in 2008 by Alloysious Massaquoi, Kayus Bankole and Graham 'G' Hastings, the group started performing in nightclubs when the band members were all in their teens.

In 2012, they signed to LA-based label Anticon and released their introductory mixtapes, Tape One and Tape Two, with Tape Two winning the Scottish Album of the Year Award ("The SAY Award").

The trio then signed to Big Dada and released their debut album, Dead, which was released in 2014. The album gained a lot of critical attention and went on to win the Mercury Prize. Dead entered the UK albums chart at number 35 and topped the independent UK album chart.

Following an extensive world tour the band decamped to Berlin to begin work on their second album, White Men Are Black Men Too, which was released in April 2015. It peaked at number 41 on the UK Albums Chart.
 
In June 2017 Young Fathers played in the Royal Festival Hall at the Southbank Centre as part of M.I.A.'s Meltdown Festival.

Six tracks on the T2 Trainspotting soundtrack feature Young Fathers, including "Only God Knows", written specifically for the film. In a statement the director Danny Boyle described the song as "the heartbeat for the film".

Young Fathers' third studio album, Cocoa Sugar, was announced with the single "In My View" on 17 January 2018. The album was released on British independent label Ninja Tune on 9 March 2018. The album entered the UK Albums Chart at number 28, making it the band's highest-charting album. It won the Scottish Album of the Year Award for 2018.

The trio released their fourth studio album, Heavy Heavy, via Ninja Tune on 3 February 2023.

While not an overtly political band, Young Fathers have spoken about issues such as racism and the treatment of refugees Due to their support of the BDS movement, the band was dropped from the 2018 Ruhrtriennale line-up.

The band were featured on the FIFA 19 and FIFA 23 soundtracks, with the songs "Border Girl" and "Rice" respectively.

Members
 Alloysious Massaquoi was born in Liberia and moved to Edinburgh at the age of four, where he attended Boroughmuir High School.
 Kayus Bankole was born in Edinburgh to Nigerian parents. He spent several years living in Maryland and Nigeria before moving back to the city of his birth, in his teens. He went on to attend Boroughmuir High School in Edinburgh, the same school as Alloysious and the two became close friends. Bankole has commented that Scotland's history in relation to slavery should be taught in schools to help overcome systemic racism
 Graham "G" Hastings was born in Edinburgh and grew up in the North Edinburgh housing scheme of Drylaw.

Discography

Studio albums

Mixtapes

Singles

Remixes
 "Girlfriend (Young Fathers Remix)" by Phoenix from Wolfgang Amadeus Phoenix (Remix Collection) (2009)
 "Nicotine Love (StraightFace Remix)" by Tricky (2014)

Guest appearances
Young Fathers were featured on "Voodoo in My Blood", track 3 of the 2016 EP Ritual Spirit by Massive Attack.

Music videos

References

External links
 

Anticon artists
Ninja Tune artists
Big Dada artists
Musical groups from Edinburgh
Scottish hip hop groups
Scottish boy bands
People educated at Boroughmuir High School